The Kremnica Mountains are a volcanic mountain range in central Slovakia. They are part of the Western Carpathians and the Slovenské stredohorie Mts.

The mountain range is situated east of the town of Kremnica, which gave it its name. It is bordered by Veľká Fatra and Turiec Basin  in the north, Zvolen Basin  in the east, Žiar Basin  and Štiavnica Mountains  in the south, and Vtáčnik in the west. The highest mountain is Flochová at 1,317 m.

The Kremnica Mountains are divided into five subdivisions:

 Kunešovská hornatina (northwest)
 Jastrabská vrchovina (southwest)
 Flochovský chrbát (central part and north)
 Turovské predhorie (south)
 Malachovské predhorie (east)

Mountain ranges of Slovakia
Mountain ranges of the Western Carpathians